Simon Helg (born 10 April 1990) is a Swedish footballer who plays as a midfielder.

Career

IF Brommapojkarna
On 2 February 2020, Helg joined IF Brommapojkarna on a free agent.

References

External links
 
 Fotbolltransfers profile
 

1990 births
Swedish footballers
Sweden youth international footballers
Allsvenskan players
Superettan players
Ettan Fotboll players
Hammarby Talang FF players
Hammarby Fotboll players
GIF Sundsvall players
Living people
IFK Eskilstuna players
Åtvidabergs FF players
Östers IF players
IF Brommapojkarna players
Association football midfielders